Kunzea cincinnata is a flowering plant in the myrtle family, Myrtaceae and is endemic to a small area on the south coast of Western Australia.

Description
The flowers are arranged in groups of up to three on the ends of the shorter branches. Flowering occurs in September and October and is followed by fruit which are urn-shaped capsules.

Taxonomy and naming
Kunzea cincinnata was first formally described in 1996 by Hellmut R. Toelken from a specimen collected near Ravensthorpe and the description was published in Journal of the Adelaide Botanic Gardens. The specific epithet (cincinnata) is a Latin word meaning "curly", referring to the hairs on the branches and leaves, distinguishing this species from the similar K. affinis.

Distribution and habitat
This kunzea is often found on the mountain ranges in coastal areas of the Great Southern to Goldfields-Esperance regions of Western Australia centred around Fitzgerald River National Park where it grows in gravelly loam soils over laterite.

ConservationKunzea cincinnata'' is classified as "not threatened" by the Western Australian Government Department of Parks and Wildlife.

References

cincinnata
Endemic flora of Western Australia
Myrtales of Australia
Rosids of Western Australia
Plants described in 1996
Taxa named by Hellmut R. Toelken